Eschenburg is a municipality in the Lahn-Dill-Kreis in Hesse, Germany. The community inherited its name from nearby Eschenburg mountain.

Geography
About 20 km², or 43.8%, of the municipal area is wooded, 9.85 km² of this being municipal forest, and the rest state forest.

Location
The individual communities within Eschenburg lie on the river Dietzhölze and in its side valleys and high dales in the Rothaargebirge's foothills. Eschenburg lies in the northern Lahn-Dill-Kreis, some 10 km northeast of Dillenburg and 23 km east of Siegen.

Neighbouring communities
Eschenburg borders in the north on the communities of Dietzhölztal (Lahn-Dill-Kreis) and Breidenbach, in the east on the communities of Steffenberg and Angelburg (all three in Marburg-Biedenkopf), in the south on the community of Siegbach, in the southwest on the town of Dillenburg, and in the west on the town of Haiger (all in the Lahn-Dill-Kreis).

Constituent communities
Eschenburg comprises the centres of Eibelshausen – which is also the administrative seat – Eiershausen, Roth, Simmersbach, Wissenbach, Hirzenhain Ort and Hirzenhain Bahnhof.

History
It is known from archaeological finds that there were settlers in what is today Eschenburg as far back as Celtic times. Eschenburg had its first documentary mention in the 13th century. Quite early on in its history, ores such as silver, nickel, copper and iron were being mined in various places, and slate and diabase were being quarried. This resulted in metalworking and hammering mills being established in the area. Only recently have archaeological digs shown the groundwork of a mediaeval forest smithy in Wissenbach.

The founding of the greater community came on 1 October 1971 through a voluntary merger of Eibelshausen, Eiershausen and Wissenbach. On 1 July 1974, the communities of Hirzenhain, Simmersbach and Roth, all from the former district of Biedenkopf, also joined, bringing today's greater community of Eschenburg into being two years before municipal reform. The 589 m-high mountain Eschenburg, seven kilometres northeast of Dillenburg, is the community's namesake.

Among the six constituent communities, Eibelshausen is the biggest. It serves as a centre point in the middle Dietzhölze Valley, is the administrative seat, and is the centre for secondary education with Haupt- and Realschule, and a gymnasial branch for ten villages in the communities of Eschenburg and Dietzhölztal.

Culture, leisure and sightseeing

Museums
The Heimatmuseum (Local Museum) in Eibelshausen as well as the Eschenburg-Dietzhölztal Culture Group offer interesting exhibits and a cultural programme featuring great diversity.

Sightseeing
Worth seeing is the more than 750-year-old village of Hirzenhain with its gliderport and downhill skiing run. Hirzenhain is the world's second oldest gliderport.

Glider flying is maintained by the Hirzenhain Gliding Club, but even non-members can take part for a small fee.

In the countryside around Simmersbach, the Philippsbuche ("Philip's Beech") recalls Landgrave Philip I's homecoming after a five-year Spanish-Dutch imprisonment on 10 September 1552.

Exercise, sport and leisure places
In Eschenburg there are many sport clubs in which one can practise almost any discipline, from football and handball to athletics, gymnastics, tennis, and so on.
 3 gymnasia
 1 ski run with lift
 1 multi-purpose hall
 7 sport fields
 3 shooting ranges with clubhouse
 5 tennis courts
 sports grounds
 fitness-studio
 football fields
 2 long-distance cross-country skiing trails
 gliderport (gliding and hang-gliding)
 indoor swimming pool with outdoor basin and beach volleyball court

Barbecue areas and leisure facilities are available in the outlying centres. Nature trails through the woods, hiking trails, and protected areas for birds and scenery beckon hikers.

Historic personage
From Wissenbach came the violinist, violist, concert director and radical pietist religion founder Johann Daniel Müller, also known as Elias or Elias Artista first predicted by Paracelsus (born 10 February 1716 in Wissenbach, died sometime after 1785, presumably in Riga). His wife was a relative of Johann Wolfgang von Goethe.

Economy and infrastructure

Established businesses
 BBT Thermotechnik GmbH Werk Eibelshausen
 Rittal Großschaltschränke GmbH & Co. KG Werk Wissenbach

Public institutions
 volunteer fire brigades in every centre
 indoor swimming pool
 Evangelical or open daycare centres in every centre
 Catholic daycare centre in Eibelshausen
 municipal library
 houses for public events in every centre
 Diakonie mobile care service

Education
 Primary schools in Eibelshausen, Wissenbach, Hirzenhain, Simmersbach and Eiershausen
 Holderbergschule (Hauptschule, Realschule, Gymnasium) in Eibelshausen

References

External links
Eschenburg

Wissenbach

Lahn-Dill-Kreis